Route 78 is a state highway in the U.S. state of Massachusetts. The highway runs  from Route 2A in Orange north to the New Hampshire state line in Warwick in northeastern Franklin County where it continues as New Hampshire Route 78.

Route description

Route 78 begins at Route 2A (Orange Road) in the town of Orange just north of the Springfield Terminal railroad tracks and the Millers River. The two-lane highway heads north as Warwick Road into the town of the same name, where its name changes to Orange Road. Route 78 passes Wheelers Pond on its way to the town center of Warwick, where its name changes to Winchester Road. The highway passes through Mount Grace State Forest and by Mount Grace before reaching its northern terminus at the New Hampshire state line, where the highway continues as New Hampshire Route 78 into the town of Winchester.

Major Intersections

References

078
Transportation in Franklin County, Massachusetts